Kurylo is a surname. It may refer to:

 Vitalii Kurylo (born 1957), Ukrainian politician
 Darryl Kurylo (born 1965), American voice actor
 Ihor Kurylo (born 1993), Ukrainian football player
 Michael Kurylo (born 1996), better known as Bunny FuFuu, American esports player

See also
 

Ukrainian-language surnames